Björn Borg defeated Ilie Năstase in the final, 6–4, 6–2, 9–7 to win the gentlemen's singles tennis title at the 1976 Wimbledon Championships. It was the first of his five consecutive Wimbledon titles, and he became the first man in the Open Era to win the title without losing a set during the tournament.

Arthur Ashe was the defending champion, but lost in the fourth round to Vitas Gerulaitis.

Seeds

  Arthur Ashe (fourth round)
  Jimmy Connors (quarterfinals)
  Ilie Năstase (final)
  Björn Borg (champion)
  Adriano Panatta (third round)
  Guillermo Vilas (quarterfinals)
  Roscoe Tanner (semifinals)
  Raúl Ramírez (semifinals)
  Tom Okker (third round)
  John Newcombe (third round)
  Eddie Dibbs (withdrew)
  Tony Roche (fourth round)
  Jaime Fillol (third round)
  Brian Gottfried (fourth round)
  Jan Kodeš (withdrew )
  Stan Smith (fourth round)

Eddie Dibbs and Jan Kodeš withdrew due to injury. They were replaced in the draw by lucky losers John Holladay and Milan Holeček respectively.

Qualifying

Draw

Finals

Top half

Section 1

Section 2

Section 3

Section 4

Bottom half

Section 5

Section 6

Section 7

Section 8

References

External links

 1976 Wimbledon Championships – Men's draws and results at the International Tennis Federation

Men's Singles
Wimbledon Championship by year – Men's singles